Toompine is a town in the locality of Quilpie in the Shire of Quilpie, Queensland, Australia.

History 
The town of Toompine was surveyed in 1870. The name is believed to derive from the Aboriginal name Thaumpine, meaning leech.

Toompine Provisional School opened in 1900. In 1901, it became a half-time school in conjunction with Duck Creek Provisional School (meaning they shared a single teacher between the two schools). The school closed in July 1902.

Education 
There are no schools in Toompine nor nearby. Options are distance education and boarding school.

Amenities 
The town has a pub, a town hall, a recreation facility, a tennis court and a playground.

References

External links 

 

Towns in Queensland
Shire of Quilpie